Basic Red 18 is a cationic azo dye used for coloring textiles.  The chromophore is the cation, which contains many functional groups, but most prominently the quaternary ammonium center.

It is produced by azo coupling of 2-chloro-4-nitrophenyldiazonium cation with the quaternary ammonium salt derived from N-ethyl-N-(2-chloroethyl)aniline and trimethylamine.

Like many dyes, methods for the removal of Basic Red 18 from waste streams has received much attention.

References

Anilines
Azo dyes
Nitrobenzenes
Quaternary ammonium compounds